Bongshar is an important village in Kamrup district in the Indian state of Assam. It is situated on the north bank of the river Brahmaputra, about 25 km from the capital city of Assam, Guwahati under is a block of Kamrup District. It has a large number of cottage industry engaged in handloom, for which is a part of Sualkuchi, also known as the "Manchester of Assam".

About 
Bongshar is a historical place situated in the Kamrup District of Assam. It is between the Silk village Sualkuchi & the holy place Hajo. Bongshar has a glorious history from the day of ‘Ramayana’ & ‘Mahabharata’.

Tourist attractions
Bhringeswar Devalaya, On the way to Sualkuchi village, there is a small lane that leads to this ancient temple on the foothill of Gandhamoan. The present temple is probably constructed by Siva Singha in 18th CE.

Silk center

This is the major part of the textile center of Assam. Muga silk and Pat silk along with Eri silk and Endi cloth from this region are famous for its quality. Mekhela chadors and Gamosas made from this indigenous materials are in demand throughout Assam as well as other parts of India. It's part of registered trademark is Sualkuchi.

Geography
Bongshar village is located in Kamrup district of Assam. The village is well connected by road with the city of Guwahati to Central Assam and Nalbari, to the west.

Education
Bongshar has numbers of educational instructions here is the list of them :
 Bongshar Higher Secondary School
 Bongshar Jalti Das Ucchatar Madhyamik Vidyalaya
 Bongshar MV School
 Bhringwsar High School, Bongshar
 Bongshar Bhirngeswar LP School
 Bongshar Gondhmow LP School
 Sanpara LP School, Bongshar
 Sankardev Sishu Vidyaniketan, Bongshar
 Abhaypuria Pam LP School

References

External links
Sualkuchi

Cities and towns in Kamrup district